The following is a list of the power stations in Qatar.

Gas

See also

Energy in Qatar
List of largest power stations in the world

References

Qatar
Power stations